This list of countries by largest historical GDP shows how the membership and rankings of the world's ten largest economies has changed. While the United States has consistently had the world's largest economy for some time, in the last fifty years the world has seen the rapid rise and fall in relative terms of the economies of other countries while the share of the United States has also risen.

Overview of the ten largest economies

By average values of GDP (nominal)

By average values of GDP (PPP)

World Bank statistics of the ten largest economies by GDP (PPP)

Angus Maddison statistics of the ten largest economies by GDP (PPP)

Main GDP countries
The United States Department of Agriculture has calculated the share of every country to global real GDP from 1969 to 2010.

European Union
The European Union represented 36.6% of the world's GDP at 1980 (highest point), and was at its lowest in 1985 at 30.02%. It currently produces 22.6% of global GDP in 2022.

United States
The United States represented 28.69% of the world's economy in 1960 (highest point), and was at its lowest point at 21.42% in 2011. It accounted for 1.8% of the world's economy in 1820, 8.9% in 1870, and 19.1% in 1913. The United States produced 25.04% of global GDP in 2022.

China
China represented 1.618% of the world's economy in 1987 (lowest point), rising to 18.32% in 2022 (highest point). It accounted for 17.3% of the world's economy in 1870 and 34% in 1820. China's share of global GDP varied from a quarter to a third of global output between the year 1 until the late 19th century.

See also
List of regions by past GDP (PPP)

References 

historical largest GDP
GDP